Siq'i Urqu (Quechua siq'i scratch, urqu mountain, "scratch mountain", hispanicized spelling Seque Orcco) is a mountain in the Andes of Peru which reaches a height of approximately . It is located in the Cusco Region, Chumbivilcas Province, Santo Tomás District, and in the Espinar Province, Coporaque District.

References 

Mountains of Peru
Mountains of Cusco Region